The Iowa Hawkeyes football team was founded in 1889 to represent the University of Iowa in intercollegiate competition, and it has participated in the sport every season since. Over the course of the team's history, individual Hawkeye players of exceptional ability have received many accolades.

Iowa has had several players inducted into the Pro Football Hall of Fame, College Football Hall of Fame, Canadian Football Hall of Fame, and Iowa Sports Hall of Fame. Individual Hawkeyes have won many prestigious national awards, including the Outland Trophy, the Davey O'Brien Award, the Doak Walker Award, the Jim Thorpe Award, and the Heisman Trophy.  92 Hawkeyes have been named a first-team or second-team All-American, and 28 have been named consensus first-team All-Americans.

The Iowa Hawkeyes have had ten players win the Big Ten Most Valuable Player Award, and 219 Hawks have earned All-Big Ten recognition. Iowa has had 244 NFL draft picks, and several former Hawkeye players have gone on to become NFL head coaches or Division I college head coaches.

National honorees

Annual awards

Individual award winners

Heisman Trophy
Nile Kinnick – 1939
Maxwell Award
Nile Kinnick – 1939
Chuck Long – 1985
AP Athlete of the Year
Nile Kinnick – 1939
AP Player of the Year
Brad Banks – 2002
Davey O'Brien Award
Chuck Long – 1985
Brad Banks – 2002
UPI Lineman of the Year
Alex Karras – 1957
Mosi Tatupu Award
Kahlil Hill – 2001
John Mackey Award
Dallas Clark – 2002
T. J. Hockenson – 2018
Ozzie Newsome Award
T. J. Hockenson – 2018
Jack Tatum Trophy
Desmond King – 2015
Josh Jackson – 2017
Jack Lambert Trophy
Josey Jewell – 2017
Lott IMPACT Trophy
Josey Jewell – 2017
Lou Groza Award
Nate Kaeding – 2002
Doak Walker Award
Shonn Greene – 2008
Jim Brown Award
Shonn Greene – 2008
Jim Thorpe Award
Desmond King – 2015
Outland Trophy
Cal Jones – 1955
Alex Karras – 1957
Robert Gallery – 2003
Brandon Scherff – 2014
Rimington Trophy
Tyler Linderbaum – 2021
Butkus Award
Jack Campbell - 2022

Coaching award winners

AFCA Coach of the Year
Eddie Anderson – 1939
AP Coach of the Year Award
Kirk Ferentz – 2002
Walter Camp Coach of the Year Award
Kirk Ferentz – 2002
Bobby Dodd Coach of the Year Award
Kirk Ferentz – 2015
Eddie Robinson Coach of the Year Award
Kirk Ferentz – 2015
Woody Hayes Trophy
Kirk Ferentz – 2015
Amos Alonzo Stagg Award
Hayden Fry – 2005
Sporting News College Football Coach of the Year
Hayden Fry – 1981

Team Awards

Joe Moore Award
Iowa – 2016
Disney's Wide World of Sports Spirit Award
Iowa – 2017
Laureus World Sports Award for Best Sporting Moment
Iowa – 2017

Heisman Trophy nominees
The most prestigious of these individual awards is the Heisman Trophy. Nile Kinnick won the award in 1939, and four other Hawkeyes have placed second in the voting. In all, nine Hawkeye players have finished in the top ten in the Heisman Trophy balloting, with Chuck Long doing so twice:

Hall of Fame inductees

College Football Hall of Fame

Nile Kinnick, Duke Slater, and coach Howard Jones were all inducted in the inaugural College Football Hall of Fame class in 1951.  In all, ten players and six coaches now represent Iowa in the College Football Hall of Fame:

Pro Football Hall of Fame

Five Hawkeyes have been inducted into the Pro Football Hall of Fame:

Canadian Football Hall of Fame 

Three Hawkeyes have been inducted into the Canadian Football Hall of Fame for their play in the Canadian Football League:

Iowa Sports Hall of Fame

The Iowa Sports Hall of Fame, sponsored by the Des Moines Register, honors outstanding athletes and sports contributors.  To be eligible, members must have either been born in Iowa or gained prominence while competing for a college or university in Iowa.  Aubrey Devine, Nile Kinnick, and Duke Slater were three of the five football players inducted when the Hall was founded in 1951.  25 Hawkeye players and 3 Hawkeye coaches have been inducted into the Iowa Sports Hall of Fame:

University of Iowa Athletics Hall of Fame

The University of Iowa started an Athletics Hall of Fame in 1989.  Ten football players were inducted in the initial class, and it has since expanded to include 50 football players and coaches:

Retired numbers 

Two numbers have been retired by the Hawkeye football program, Nile Kinnick's #24 and Cal Jones' #62.  Both Kinnick and Jones were consensus first team All-Americans, and both men tragically perished in separate plane crashes before their 25th birthday.

Kinnick won the University of Iowa's only Heisman Trophy in 1939 and is the man for whom Kinnick Stadium is named.  Jones was the first African-American to win the Outland Trophy and is the only Hawkeye to be named first-team All-American three times.

All-American selections 

Each year, numerous publications and organizations release lists of All-America teams, hypothetical rosters of players considered the best in the nation at their respective positions. The National Collegiate Athletic Association (NCAA) uses officially recognized All-America selectors to determine the consensus selections. Over time, the sources used to determine the consensus selections have varied. Currently, the NCAA uses five "major" selectors to determine consensus All-Americans: the Associated Press (AP), American Football Coaches Association (AFCA), Football Writers Association of America (FWAA), The Sporting News (TSN), and the Walter Camp Football Foundation (WCFF). Many other publications and organization compile their own "minor" All-America teams in addition to the selectors listed here.

Clyde Williams is often referred to as "Iowa's first All-American". Williams, who led the Hawkeyes to its first Big Ten championship in 1900, was named a third-team All-American by Walter Camp that season.  Williams was the first player west of the Mississippi River to garner All-American honors. However, since the following list constitutes only first-team and second-team All-Americans, Williams is not included here.

Iowa has had 74 first-team All-Americans and 33 second-team All-Americans.  Of Iowa's 74 first-team All-Americans, 31  were consensus first-team All-American selections (28 individuals as Cal Jones and Larry Station won the award twice), while 13 were unanimous first-team selections. As of 2022, Iowa's 13 unanimous All Americans is ranked 15th most in college football history.

*—Unanimous selection

Big Ten honorees

Most Valuable Players 

The Chicago Tribune Silver Football has been awarded since 1924 by the Chicago Tribune to the college football player determined to be the Most Valuable Player of the Big Ten Conference. Ten Hawkeyes have won the Big Ten MVP award, the third largest number of winners by any school, trailing only Michigan and Ohio State:

Annual individual honors 

Coaches and media of the Big Ten also make annual selections for additional individual honors:

All-conference selections 

Through the 2022 season, Iowa has had 253 first team All-Big Ten selections, comprising 189 players, starting with Clyde Williams and Joe Warner in 1900. There have been 55 players named multiple years, 9 of whom were three-time selections.

All-time team

In 1989, Iowa fans selected an all-time University of Iowa football team during the 100th anniversary celebration of Iowa football.  Twelve starters and eight honorable mentions were selected on both offense and defense, along with a Most Valuable Player:

NCAA FBS all-time records
The following is a list of team and individual NCAA FBS records that are held by the Iowa Hawkeyes.

Best Perfect Passing Game - Iowa vs. Northwestern, 2002 - 12 for 12 (100 PCT.)
Most Touchdowns on Fumble Returns - Iowa vs. Minnesota, 1994 - 2 (tied)
Most Opponent's Field Goals Blocked, One Quarter - Iowa vs. Northern Iowa, 2009 - 2 (tied)
Most Games Gaining 100 or More Rushing in a Season - Shonn Greene, 2008–13
Most Consecutive Rushes for a Touchdown in a Game -  Aaron Greving, Iowa vs. Kent State 2001 - 3 (tied), (TD's for 14, 1, & 26 yards)
Highest Average per Punt in a Season (min. 40-49 punts) - Reggie Roby, 1981 - 49.8 (44 for 2,193)
Most Passes Intercepted by a Linebacker in One Game - Grant Steen, Iowa vs. Indiana 2002 - 3 (tied)
Players Gaining 1,000 Yards on Punt Returns and 1,000 Yards on Kickoff Returns in a Career - Tim Dwight, 1994-1997 - (1,051 & 1,133)
Most Touchdowns Scored on Kick Returns in a Game (At Least One Punt Return & One Kickoff Return) - Kahlil Hill, Iowa vs. Western Michigan 1998 - 2 (tied)
Most Blocked Field Goals in a Game - Kenny Iwebema, Iowa vs. Syracuse 2008 - 2 (tied)
Passing for a Touchdown and Scoring on a Pass Reception and Punt Return in a Game - Tim Dwight, Iowa vs. Indiana 1997
Most Field Goals Made, 50 Yards or More in a Game - Tim Douglas, Iowa vs. Illinois 1998 - 3 (tied), (51, 58, & 51 yards)

NFL draft picks

Iowa has had at least one player drafted in every NFL Draft since 1978.  Through the 2020 NFL Draft, Iowa has had 294 draft picks: 266 in the NFL, 21 in the AFL, and seven in the AAFC (the AFL and AAFC both later merged with the NFL). Iowa has had the following 23 first round NFL Draft selections:

Hawkeye head coaches 

Several former Hawkeye players have later been named NFL head coaches or Division I college head coaches:

Other notable players 
 See also: Iowa Players
 See also: List of Letterwinners

A few notable players not previously mentioned:

Kinney Holbrook
Archie Alexander
Oran Pape
Kevin Kasper
Ladell Betts
Charles Godfrey
Albert Young
Sean Considine

References

Iowa
Iowa Hawkeyes football honorees